Christ College, located in Rajkot, India, is the first English medium College in Arts and Science in the Saurashtra-Kachchh region. Inaugurated by Dr. APJ Abdul Kalam on 25 December 2001. It is included under 2(f) & 12B by UGC and the youngest college in India to be assessed and re-accredited by NAAC with A+ Status in the year 2014 and IAO.

External links
Christ College, Rajkot
Christ Institute of Management, Rajkot
Christ Polytechnic, Rajkot

 

Education in Rajkot